Porina rivalis is a species of semi-aquatic, saxicolous (rock-dwelling), and crustose lichen in the family Trichotheliaceae. Found in Great Britain, it was formally described as a new species in 2015 by lichenologist Alan Orange. The species had been known previously from streams in Wales, but it had been incorrectly identified as Porina lectissima. Porina rivalis has also been recorded from streams in South-west England and North England. It has a thin brown thallus (20–70 μm thick) with prominent dark brown or black perithecia. Its ascospores are shaped like narrow ellipsoids, have three septa, and typically measure 13.0–17.5 by 4.0–5.5 μm.

References

Gyalectales
Lichen species
Lichens described in 2015
Lichens of Northern Europe
Taxa named by Alan Orange